Kevin Marquis Murphy (born March 6, 1990) is an American professional basketball player for Al-Ittihad Jeddah of the Saudi Premier League. He played college basketball for Tennessee Tech.

High school career
Born in Atlanta, Murphy earned four varsity letters in basketball at Creekside High School in Fairburn, Georgia. In his senior season at Creekside High School, Murphy averaged 26 points, 8 rebounds and 3 assists per game.

College career

Freshman season
In his freshman season at Tennessee Tech, Murphy averaged 9.6 points, 2.9 rebounds, and 1.8 assists per game.

Sophomore season
As a sophomore, Murphy averaged 15.3 points per game, 3.9 rebounds, and 2.0 assists per game. He was awarded the Best Offensive Player Award by head coach Mike Sutton.

Junior season
In his junior year, Murphy averaged 17.0 points, 4.5 rebounds, and 1.7 assists per game. In the Ohio Valley Conference men's basketball tournament, Murphy averaged 24.3 points per game and was named to the All-Tournament Team. Murphy was also an All-OVC first team selection.

Senior season
On January 30, 2012 Murphy scored 50 points in a win over SIU Edwardsville, the most for any Division I player in the 2011-12 NCAA Division I men's basketball season. Murphy averaged 20.6 points, 5.2 rebounds, and 2.3 assists per game during the season. He was also named to the OVC All-Tournament Team and the All-OVC first team for the second consecutive year. Following the season, Murphy participated in the Portsmouth Invitational Tournament. He was named to the All-Tournament Team.

Professional career
Murphy was selected with the 47th overall pick in the 2012 NBA draft by the Utah Jazz. He joined the Jazz for the 2012 NBA Summer League. On November 26, 2012, Murphy was assigned to the Reno Bighorns of the NBA D-League. On January 8, 2013, the Jazz recalled him from the D-League. On July 10, 2013, Murphy was involved in a three-team trade that sent him and Andre Iguodala, then of the Denver Nuggets, to the Golden State Warriors. He joined the Warriors for the 2013 NBA Summer League. On July 24, 2013, Murphy was waived by the Warriors.

On August 11, 2013, he signed with Strasbourg IG of France. On December 25, 2013, he left Strasbourg. On January 4, 2014, he was acquired by the Idaho Stampede.

On August 27, 2014, he signed with the Utah Jazz. However, he was later waived by the Jazz on October 10, 2014. On November 3, 2014, he was reacquired by the Idaho Stampede. On December 30, 2014, he left the Stampede after appearing in 15 games. On January 2, 2015, he signed with the Zhejiang Lions of the Chinese Basketball Association. Following the conclusion of the CBA season, he returned to the United States, and on February 19, he was reacquired by the Stampede. On February 26, he was traded to the Grand Rapids Drive in exchange for Brandon Fields.

On November 8, 2015, Murphy signed with the Hitachi SunRockers of the Japan Basketball League.

On September 8, 2016, Murphy signed with the Orlando Magic. However, he was later waived by the Magic on October 16 after appearing in two preseason games. On November 17, 2016, Murphy was reacquired by the Grand Rapids Drive.

On April 22, 2017, Murphy signed with Guangxi of the Chinese National Basketball League. On July 19, 2017, Murphy scored a career-high 67 points to go along with 6 rebounds in a 118-132 loss to the Lhasa Pure Land.

On August 5, 2017, Murphy signed with Croatian club Cedevita Zagreb. On January 20, 2018, he parted ways with Cedevita. On September 26, 2018, Murphy signed with the San Miguel Beermen of the Philippine Basketball Association (PBA). 

In 2022, Kevin Murphy was named the Season 5 BIG3 MVP. 

In October 2022, Murphy played for Kuwaiti club Kazma in the 2022 Arab Club Basketball Championship. On October 12, in the quarterfinals, he scored 53 points in a 106–101 overtime win over Al Ittihad Alexandria.

In February 2023, Murphy returned to the Philippines, this time signing with the NorthPort Batang Pier to replace Marcus Weathers as the team's import for the 2023 PBA Governors' Cup.

References

External links

Kevin Murphy at nbadleague.com

1990 births
Living people
ABA League players
American expatriate basketball people in China
American expatriate basketball people in Croatia
American expatriate basketball people in France
American expatriate basketball people in Japan
American expatriate basketball people in the Philippines
American men's 3x3 basketball players
American men's basketball players
Basketball players from Atlanta
Big3 players
Grand Rapids Drive players
Idaho Stampede players
KK Cedevita players
NBA G League Ignite players
NorthPort Batang Pier players
People from Fairburn, Georgia
Philippine Basketball Association imports
Reno Bighorns players
San Miguel Beermen players
Shooting guards
SIG Basket players
Sun Rockers Shibuya players
Tennessee Tech Golden Eagles men's basketball players
Utah Jazz draft picks
Utah Jazz players
Zhejiang Lions players